The 1862 United States elections occurred in the middle of Republican President Abraham Lincoln's first term, during the Third Party System and the Civil War. Members of the 38th United States Congress were chosen in this election. West Virginia and Nevada joined the union during the 38th Congress, but several states were in rebellion, reducing the size of both chambers of Congress. The Republican Party kept control of Congress, although it was reduced to a plurality in the House.

In the House, Democrats won several seats, ending the Republican majority. Republicans won a plurality of seats, while several seats were occupied by politicians identifying as Unionists. Republican Schuyler Colfax won election as Speaker of the House.

In the Senate, Republicans picked up a small number of seats, retaining a commanding majority.

See also
1862–63 United States House of Representatives elections
1862–63 United States Senate elections
Unconditional Union Party
Constitutional Union Party

References

1862 elections in the United States
1862
United States midterm elections